Sophia Mulsap (born 6 June 1990) is a former Thai tennis player.

Mulsap has career-high WTA rankings of 791 in singles, achieved on 6 October 2008, and 246 in doubles, set on 19 May 2008. She has won 2 doubles titles on the ITF Women's Circuit. Her only WTA Tour main draw appearance came at the 2007 PTT Bangkok Open, where she partnered Varatchaya Wongteanchai in the doubles event.

ITF finals

Doubles (2 titles, 3 runner–ups)

ITF junior finals

Singles (1–2)

Doubles (6–5)

References

External links
 
 

1990 births
Living people
Sophia Mulsap
Sophia Mulsap
Sophia Mulsap